Frank Martin Dooley (born March 21, 1929) is an American former competition swimmer who represented the United States at the 1952 Summer Olympics in Helsinki, Finland.  Dooley swam for the gold medal-winning U.S. team in the qualifying heats of the men's 4×200-meter freestyle relay.  He did not receive a medal, however, because under the Olympic swimming rules in effect in 1952, only relay swimmers who competed in the event final were medal-eligible.

He died in Norfolk, Connecticut on November 14, 2022, aged 93.

See also
 List of Ohio State University people
 World record progression 4 × 100 metres freestyle relay

References

1929 births
Living people
American male freestyle swimmers
Ohio State Buckeyes men's swimmers
Olympic swimmers of the United States
Sportspeople from New Haven, Connecticut
Swimmers at the 1952 Summer Olympics
20th-century American people